Tibor Ivanišević (born 16 August 1990) is a Serbian handball player for German club VfL Gummersbach and the Serbia national team.

Club career
After starting out at Voždovac, Ivanišević spent three seasons with Crvena zvezda, before moving abroad to Hungarian side Orosházi FKSE in 2013. He would go on to play for Borac Banja Luka in the 2015–16 season.

In January 2017, Ivanišević signed with Danish club Skjern. He saved seven penalties in an EHF Champions League game against Motor Zaporizhzhia on 4 March 2018, helping his team qualify for the knockout stage of the competition.

International career
Ivanišević won a silver medal with the Serbian team at the 2015 Summer Universiade and represented Serbia in two European Championships (2018 and 2020).

Honours
Skjern
 Danish Men's Handball League: 2017–18

References

External links
 MKSZ record
 

1990 births
Living people
Sportspeople from Mostar
Serbs of Bosnia and Herzegovina
Serbian male handball players
RK Crvena zvezda players
RK Borac Banja Luka players
HSG Wetzlar players
Handball-Bundesliga players
Expatriate handball players
Serbian expatriate sportspeople in Hungary
Serbian expatriate sportspeople in Denmark
Serbian expatriate sportspeople in Germany
Universiade medalists in handball
Universiade silver medalists for Serbia
Medalists at the 2015 Summer Universiade